Lemyra alikangensis is a moth in the family Erebidae first described by Embrik Strand in 1915. It is found in Taiwan.

References

Moths described in 1915
alikangensis